Yelena Valeryevna Välbe (née Trubitsyna; born 20 April 1968) is a Russian former cross-country skier. She won a record-high 14 gold medals at the FIS World Championships, including all five golds in the 1997 edition. She also won three Olympic gold medals and four bronze medals in various Winter Olympic Games as well as four World Cup Crystal Globes.

She has been president of the Russian Cross-Country Ski Association since 2010, and manager of the Russian National Cross-Country Team since 2012. White Snow, a biographical sports drama about Välbe, was released in 2020–21.

She was elected to the FIS Council in 2021, but after she supported the Russian invasion of Ukraine in 2022, a number of European Ski Federations objected to her participation in the 2022 election, and Välbe's nomination was publicly opposed by the representatives of Sweden, Poland and Finland. As a result, she was removed from the position after garnering the fewest votes.

Career

Summary
At the FIS Nordic World Ski Championships, Välbe won a record-high fourteen gold (1989: 10 km freestyle, 30 km; 1991: 10 km, 15 km, 4 ×5 km relay; 1993: 15 km, 4 × 5 km relay; 1995: 30 km, 4 x 5 km relay), and three silver medals (1989: 4 × 5 km relay, 1991: 30 km, 1995: 15 km), including all five golds at the 1997 championships in Trondheim (5 km, 5 km + 10 km combined pursuit, 15 km, 30 km, and 4 × 5 km relay). She also won three gold (all in relays) and four bronze medals in various Winter Olympic Games as well as the FIS Cross-Country World Cup five times (1989, 1991, 1992, 1995, 1997). Välbe also won the 5 km (1991) and 15 km (1992) competitions at the Holmenkollen ski festival. She received the Holmenkollen medal in 1992.

After retirement
In 2010, Välbe was elected as President of the Russian Cross-Country Ski Association. – FIS 29 June 2010 article accessed 30 June 2010. Late in 2012, she got the position of manager for the Russian Cross-Country Team towards the 2014 Winter Olympics in Sochi. She was also manager for the Russian team during the 2006 Winter Olympics in Turin.

Välbe was elected to the FIS Council in 2021, but after she supported the Russian invasion of Ukraine in 2022, a number of European Ski Federations objected to her participation in the 2022 election, and Välbe's nomination was publicly opposed by the representatives of Sweden, Poland and Finland. As a result, she was removed from the position after garnering the fewest votes.

Cross-country skiing results
All results are sourced from the International Ski Federation (FIS).

Olympic Games
 7 medals – (3 gold, 4 bronze)

World Championships
 17 medals – (14 gold, 3 silver)

World Cup

Season standings

Individual podiums
45 victories 
81 podiums

Team podiums
 24 victories – (24 ) 
 32 podiums – (30 , 2 )

Note:   Until the 1999 World Championships and the 1994 Olympics, World Championship and Olympic races were included in the World Cup scoring system.

Personal life
Formerly she was married to Estonian cross-country skier Urmas Välbe. Together they had one child, Franz. She then married Maxim Dovolnov and gave birth to Polina and Varvara. She now lives in Moscow region.

In popular culture
White Snow – a biographical sports drama film about Välbe.

References

External links
 
  – click Holmenkollmedaljen for downloadable pdf file 
  – click Vinnere for downloadable pdf file 

1968 births
Living people
People from Magadan
Cross-country skiers at the 1992 Winter Olympics
Cross-country skiers at the 1994 Winter Olympics
Cross-country skiers at the 1998 Winter Olympics
Holmenkollen medalists
Holmenkollen Ski Festival winners
Russian female cross-country skiers
Olympic gold medalists for the Unified Team
Olympic bronze medalists for the Unified Team
Olympic gold medalists for Russia
Olympic cross-country skiers of Russia
Olympic cross-country skiers of the Unified Team
Olympic medalists in cross-country skiing
FIS Nordic World Ski Championships medalists in cross-country skiing
FIS Cross-Country World Cup champions
Medalists at the 1998 Winter Olympics
Medalists at the 1994 Winter Olympics
Medalists at the 1992 Winter Olympics
Honoured Coaches of Russia
Sportspeople from Magadan Oblast